Physician to the King (or Queen, as appropriate) is a title held by physicians of the Medical Household of the Sovereign of the United Kingdom. Part of the Royal Household, the Medical Household includes physicians, who treat general conditions, and extra physicians, specialists who are brought in as required.

In 1973, the position of Head of the Medical Household was created. The occupant of that position is also a Physician to the King.

Postholders

Royal households before 1901 
 Balthasar Guersye (died 1557), Physician to Henry VIII and Catherine of Aragon
 Matthias de Lobel, Physician to King James I
 Martin Schöner (died 1611), Physician to Anne of Denmark.
 Sir Richard Croft, Physician to King George III, King George IV and Princess Charlotte Augusta.
 Sir Andrew Halliday, Physician to King William IV and to Queen Victoria
 Dr Cornwallis Hewett, Physician Extraordinary to William IV
 Sir William Henry Broadbent, Bt., KCVO, MD, Physician Extraordinary to Queen Victoria (1896–1901)
 Sir Henry Thompson, 1st Baronet, FRCS (1820–1904), Physician to Queen Victoria
 Sir Thomas Grainger Stewart, FRSE, FRCPE (1837–1900), Physician-in-Ordinary to the Queen in Scotland from 1882
 George Steward Beatson (–1874) Honorary Physician to the Queen
Sir Alexander Nisbet (d. 1874), Honorary Physician to the Queen
 John Davidson, appointed Honorary Physician to the Queen in 1874

Royal Household of King Edward VII 
Physician-in-Ordinary to His Majesty
 Sir William Henry Broadbent, Bt., KCVO, MD 29 March 1901 – 1907
 Sir James Reid, Bt., GCVO, KCB, MD 29 March 1901 – 6 May 1910
 Sir Francis Laking, Bt., GCVO, KCB, MD 29 March 1901 – 6 May 1910

Physicians Extraordinary to His Majesty
 Surgeon-General Sir Joseph Fayrer, Bt., KCSI, MD 29 March 1901–?
 Sir Richard Douglas Powell, Bt., KCVO, MD 29 March 1901–?
 Sir Edward Henry Sieveking, MD 29 March 1901 – 1904
 Sir Felix Semon, MD 29 March 1901–?
 John Lowe, MD 29 March 1901 – 1904

Honorary Physicians-in-Ordinary to His Majesty in Scotland
 Sir William Tennant Gairdner, KCB, MD 29 March 1901–?
 George William Balfour, MD 29 March 1901 – 1903

Honorary Physicians-in-Ordinary to His Majesty in Ireland
 Sir John Thomas Banks, KCB, MD 29 March 1901–?
 William Moore, MD 29 March 1901–?

Royal Households 1910–1973 
 Bertrand Edward Dawson, 1st Viscount Dawson of Penn, GCVO KCB KCMG PC FRCP (1864–1945), Physician to King George V, King Edward VIII and King George VI.
 Sir Thomas Peel Dunhill, GCVO CMG FRCP (1876–1957), Extra Physician to King George V, King Edward VIII, King George VI and Queen Elizabeth II.
 Thomas Horder, 1st Baron Horder, GCVO (1871–1955), Extra Physician to King Edward VII, King George V, King Edward VIII, King George VI and Queen Elizabeth II.
 Sir John Weir GCVO & Chain CMG MD (1879–1971), Physician to King George V, King Edward VIII, King George VI and Queen Elizabeth II.
 Sir Arnold Stott KBE FRCP (1885–1958), Extra Physician to King George VI and Queen Elizabeth II.
 Andrew Best Semple (1963–1965), Honorary Physician to Queen Elizabeth II
 Air Marshal Sir Sidney Richard Carlyle Nelson (1961-1967), Honorary Physician too Queen Elizabeth II.
 Air Vice-Marshal Frederick Charles Hurrell CB, OBE, Honorary Physician to Queen Elizabeth II.
 Professor Kenneth Gordon Lowe CVO FRCP MD, Queen's Physician in Scotland.

Royal Household post-1973 
 see Heads of the Medical Household.

References

See also 
 Physician to the President

Positions within the British Royal Household
Court physicians